Penguin Cafe is a band originally conceived by Arthur Jeffes, son of Simon Jeffes and Emily Young, as a continuation of his father's project, the Penguin Cafe Orchestra. The group is distinct from the original Penguin Cafe Orchestra, despite the similarities in genre, name, and even repertoire (Penguin Cafe often plays PCO pieces in concert.)  There are no members of the original PCO in Penguin Cafe.

Penguin Cafe's current ten-person line-up was originally brought together in 2009, featuring a group of musicians ranging from "luminaries from The Royal College of Music to members of bands such as Suede and Gorillaz". The group produced their first album, A Matter of Life... in 2010, which was released on their own Penguin Cafe label.

Discography
 A Matter of Life... (2011)
 The Red Book (2014)
 The Imperfect Sea (2017)
 Handfuls of Night (2019)
 A Matter of Life... 2021 (2021)

Personnel
 Arthur Jeffes – piano, ukulele, harmonium
 Des Murphy – ukulele
 Andy Waterworth – double bass
 Rebecca Waterworth – cello
 Darren Berry – violin
 Neil Codling – piano, ukulele, cuatro, guitar
 Vincent Greene - viola
 Tom Chichester-Clark – harmonium, ukulele
 Cass Browne – percussion
 Pete Radcliffe – percussion
 Oli Langford - violin

References

External links
Official Site

English folk musical groups
Chamber jazz ensembles
Erased Tapes Records artists